Line S3 of the Nanjing Metro, is a north-south suburban rapid transit line serving part of the southern and southwestern suburbs of Nanjing, running from  and . It is the first line of the Nanjing Metro with passing tracks at select stations, allowing from distinct express local services. The line crosses the Yangtze River using the Dashengguan Yangtze River Bridge. In 2012, the first phase of the project was approved by the NDRC for construction with the first section started construction on 27 December 2012. On August 13, 2017, the first phase of Line S3 started to be unmanned testing. The first phase of the line was completed by the end of 2017 and started trial operation on 6 December 2017.

Opening timeline

Station list

References

External links 
Line S3 on the official Nanjing Metro website (includes route map) 

Nanjing Metro lines
Rail transport in Jiangsu
Railway lines opened in 2017